Husbands in the City is a 1957 Italian comedy film directed by Luigi Comencini.

Plot 
When wives go on vacation, husbands hope to have fun but they don't always succeed.

Cast
 Nino Taranto: Giacinto
 Franco Fabrizi: Alberto
 Renato Salvatori: Mario
 Dolores Palumbo: Doorwoman
 Memmo Carotenuto: Fernando
 Dina Perbellini: Mother-in-law
 Marisa Merlini: Aida
 Yvette Masson: Quinta
 Irene Cefaro: Gina
 Franca Gandolfi: Sandrina
 Franca Valeri: Olivetti
 Giorgia Moll: Lionella
 Hélène Rémy: Romana
 Clara Bindi: Giacinto's wife

References

External links
 
  

1957 films
1957 comedy films
Italian comedy films
Films directed by Luigi Comencini
Adultery in films
Films with screenplays by Suso Cecchi d'Amico
Films with screenplays by Ruggero Maccari
Films set in Rome
Films shot in Rome
1950s Italian-language films
1950s Italian films